George Hyde (6 May 1905 – 1974) was an Australian long-distance runner who competed in the 1928 Summer Olympics.

References

1905 births
1974 deaths
Australian male long-distance runners
Olympic athletes of Australia
Athletes (track and field) at the 1928 Summer Olympics
20th-century Australian people